Trần Văn Minh (21 July 1932 – 27 August 1997) was a general of the Republic of Vietnam Air Force (RVNAF).

Career
In 1956 Minh was promoted to captain. In 1958 he received jet-training on the Cessna T-37 and was promoted to major. In 1960 he attended the Air Command and Staff School at Maxwell Air Force Base, Montgomery, Alabama, United States. On his return to South Vietnam he served as deputy base commander of Nha Trang Air Base, then deputy commander Bien Hoa Air Base, then Command Assistant Deputy at Danang Air Base. In 1964 he was appointed commander of the 62nd Tactical Wing at Pleiku Air Base.

In November 1967 Minh was promoted to brigadier-general and commander of the RVNAF, succeeding Nguyễn Cao Kỳ who was elected as Vice-President of the Republic of Vietnam. Minh would be the longest-serving commander of the RVNAF holding command from 1967 until the Fall of Saigon in April 1975. In 1968 he was promoted to major-general (Thiếu Tướng).

At 08:00 on 29 April 1975, Minh and 30 of his staff arrived at the Defense Attaché Office (DAO) compound demanding evacuation, signifying the complete loss of RVNAF command and control.

Honour

National honours 

 :
  Grand Cross of the National Order of Vietnam
  Military Merit Medal
  Air Force Distinguished Service Order First Class
  Gallantry Cross
  Air Gallantry Cross Bronze Wing ribbon
  Wound Medal
  Armed Forces Honor Medal First Class
  Staff Service Medal Second Class
  Technical Service Medal First Class
  Training Service Medal First Class
  Vietnam Campaign Medal
  Military Service Medal
  Air Service Medal First Class
  Navy Service Medal First Class
  Chuong My Medal First Class

References 

1932 births
1997 deaths
South Vietnamese military personnel of the Vietnam War